HardScratch is an unincorporated community within Harrison County, Iowa, United States.

References

Unincorporated communities in Harrison County, Iowa
Unincorporated communities in Iowa